"Pledge Pin" is a song by Robert Plant from his album Pictures at Eleven.  It was a popular track on album-oriented rock radio in the United States, peaking at number 11 on the Billboard Top Tracks chart in 1982. Later released as the second single from the album, it reached number 74 on the Billboard Hot 100 and number 15 on Billboard Top Tracks.

Track listing

US 7" single
A: "Pledge Pin" (Robert Plant, Robbie Blunt) – 4:01
B: "Fat Lip" (Plant, Blunt, Jezz Woodroffe) – 5:05

References

Robert Plant songs
1982 songs
Songs written by Robbie Blunt
Swan Song Records singles
Songs written by Robert Plant